The decade of the 1390s in art involved some significant events.

Events

Works

 1391 (probable date): Royal Gold Cup produced in France
 1394
 "Oratorio of St. Andrea" – series of paintings from the school of Giotto, San Crispolto church, Bettona
 Master Bertram of Minden paints a Crucifixion
 c. 1395–1399: "Wilton Diptych" painted by an unknown artist

Births
 1399/1400: Rogier van der Weyden – one of the greatest of the school of Early Netherlandish painting (died 1464)
 1399/1403: Giovanni di Paolo – Italian painter and illustrator of manuscripts (died 1482)
 1398
 Zhu Zhanji, Xuande Emperor – Emperor of China; also a painter, especially of animals (died 1435)
 Conrad Witz – German painter, active mainly in Basel, Switzerland (died 1446)
 1397
 Borghese di Piero Borghese – Italian painter of the Florentine School and Renaissance art (died 1463)
 Paolo Uccello – Italian painter notable for his pioneering work on visual perspective in art (died 1475)
 Nōami – Japanese painter and renga poet in the service of the Ashikaga shogunate (died 1471)
 1396
 Jacopo Bellini – a founder of the Renaissance style of painting in Venice and northern Italy (died 1470)
 Du Qiong – Chinese landscape painter, calligrapher and poet during the Ming dynasty (died 1474)
 Michelozzo – Italian architect and sculptor (died 1472)
 1395
 Fra Angelico – Early Italian Renaissance painter (died 1455)
 Pisanello – painter of the early Italian Renaissance and Quattrocento (died 1455)
 Jacques Morel – French sculptor (died 1459)
 Jan van Eyck – Early Netherlandish painter active in Bruges (died 1441)
 1393: Piero di Niccolo Lamberti – Italian sculptor (died 1451)
 1392: Sassetta – Italian painter (died 1450)
 1390: Gregorio di Cecco – Italian painter of the Sienese School during the early Renaissance (died unknown)

Deaths
 1399
 Don Silvestro dei Gherarducci – Italian painter (born 1339)
 Peter Parler – German architect, best known for building Saint Vitus Cathedral and Charles Bridge in Prague (born 1300)
 1396: Agnolo Gaddi – Italian painter (died 1350)
 1393: Fang Congyi – Chinese painter during the Yuan dynasty (born 1302)
 1392: Hermann von Münster – German master glassmaker (born 1330)
 1391: Giusto de' Menabuoi – Italian painter of the early Renaissance (born 1320)
 1390: Altichiero – Italian painter of the Gothic style (born 1330)

 
Art
Years of the 14th century in art